Matthew 'Matt' Rupert Lancaster Relton, known professionally as Kidnap, formerly known as Kidnap Kid, is an English electronic dance music record producer and DJ from Sheffield, South Yorkshire. He was awarded iTunes US's 'Best Electronic Song of 2012' for his track "Vehl". Relton was educated at Silverdale School in Sheffield before completing a degree in politics and crime at the University of Leeds.

Since early 2016, Relton has been releasing music through his own record label 'Birds That Fly'. 

In 2017, Relton was nominated at the Electronic Music Awards for Record of the Year for "ABA" with Lane 8. He also performed at the 2017 Electronic Music Awards show.

In 2017, he changed his artist name from Kidnap Kid to Kidnap.

Discography

Studio albums
 Grow (2019), Armada Music

Extended plays
 The Great Confusion (2011), Squelch and Clap
 The Apocalypse of John (2011), Squelch and Clap
 Alphaville (2012), Black Butter Records
 Moments (2016), Birds That Fly

Singles

References

21st-century English musicians
1991 births
Alumni of the University of Leeds
Black Butter Records artists
English dance musicians
English electronic musicians
English record producers
Living people
Musicians from Sheffield
People educated at Silverdale School, Sheffield